Pericos is a town situated in the Municipality of Mocorito in the Mexican state of Sinaloa. As of the 2010 census, there are 6,244 inhabitants. It is the most populated town in the municipality. Approximately 85% of residents are catholic.

References

Populated places in Sinaloa